Michele Angiolillo Lombardi (5 June 1871 – 20 August 1897) was an Italian anarchist, born in Foggia, Italy. He assassinated Spanish Prime Minister Antonio Cánovas del Castillo in 1897 and was captured and executed by Spanish authorities in the same year.

Motive and the Montjuïc trial
On 7 June 1896, a bomb was thrown at the Corpus Christi procession in Barcelona. At least twelve people died and 45 were seriously injured. The crime, which was attributed by police to an unidentified anarchist, precipitated an aggressive reprisal against Spanish anarchists, communists, socialists and republicans, in what became known as the Montjuïc trial: 300 alleged revolutionaries were jailed at Montjuïc Fortress, and confessions were extracted by torture. The prime minister Antonio Cánovas del Castillo himself ordered the repression. Reports of the prisoner abuse were circulated widely in the European press.

Of the 87 prisoners taken to trial at Montjuïc, eight received death sentences; five executions were carried out. Many others were condemned to long imprisonment and the remaining prisoners were deported to Río de Oro (a Spanish colony in what is now the disputed Western Sahara).

Angiolillo, was at the time, working as a printer in the little-known Typographia institution, the section of the British printer's union that was reserved for foreigners. On May 30, 1897, Angiolillo, among at least ten thousand other people, attended a demonstration in Trafalgar Square against the brutal repression of worker's rights movements within Spain, specifically under Cánovas. Organized by the Spanish Atrocities Committee led by the anarchist Joseph Perry, a wide range of activists spoke to the crowd, including Fernando Tarrida del Mármol and Charles Malato. Malato, in his speech, asked who would avenge the people who had died under the regime of Cánovas.

After the protest, Angiolillo personally met with a man by the last name of Oller and Francisco Gana. Both of these men had terrible wounds, suffered from the torture that was administered on the order of Cánovas. The German anarchist Rudolf Rocker, who was also present, wrote the following about the meeting:

"That night when Gana showed us his crippled limbs, and the scars over his entire body left by the tortures, we understood that it is one thing to read about such matters, but quite another to hear about them from the very lips of the victims" ... "We all sat there as if turned to stone, and it was some minutes before we could utter a few words of indignation. Only Angiolillo said not a word. A little later, he suddenly rose to his feet, uttered a laconic goodbye, and abandoned the house" ... "This was the last time I saw him."

The assassination of Cánovas del Castillo

Under a false identity of a reporter for the Il Popolo newspaper by the name of Emilio Rinaldini, Michele Angiolillo traveled to Spain from London, passing through Paris and Bourdeaux. 
When he reached Madrid, he learned that Cánovas had traveled to the thermal bath resort of Santa Águeda (now a psychiatric hospital) in Mondragón, Guipúzcoa, and decided to pursue him there. On 8 August 1897, Angiolillo found Cánovas alone and shot him dead. The Prime Minister's wife hurried to the scene, shouting “Murderer! Murderer!” after the gunman. Angiolillo, in turn, bowed and declared, “Pardon, Madame. I respect you as a lady, but I regret that you were the wife of that man.” The repression and mass torture at Montjuich was a direct factor behind Michele Angiolillo's decision to assassinate Cánovas, and he claimed in his defence speech to be "no assassin, but rather an executioner", calling Cánovas, among other things, the personification of the greed of the bourgeoisie and the tyranny of power.

About Angiolillo, the New York Times wrote:

Angiolillo allowed the authorities to capture him and vehemently denied other parties' involvement in the assassination. He was executed by garrote in the nearby town of Vergara.

There is some evidence that he originally planned to kill one or two young members of the Spanish royal family, but was dissuaded by Puerto Rican nationalist leader Ramón Emeterio Betances, who suggested Cánovas del Castillo as a target instead. Betances provided logistical assistance for Angiolillo's safe travel into Spain, as well as some money.

References

Bibliography 

1871 births
1897 deaths
People from Foggia
Italian anarchists
Italian atheists
Italian assassins
Anarcho-communists
Anarchist assassins
19th-century Italian people
Politics of Spain
Executed anarchists
People executed by ligature strangulation
19th-century executions by Spain
Italian people executed abroad
Italian people convicted of murder
Italian expatriates in Spain
People convicted of murder by Spain
Assassins of heads of government
Executed assassins
1897 murders in Europe
1890s murders in Spain